Pine Ridge Golf Club is a golf course in the U.S. state of Oregon, located in the Mohawk Valley about eight miles northeast of the Eugene-Springfield area. Part of the course is located along the Mohawk River. The 18-hole course is just over 6500 yards.

History
Springfield Golf Club was established in 1957 by a group of around 40 neighbors who purchased farmland and turned it into a six-hole golf course. The course grew to nine-holes, and then to 18-holes in the 1980s. Later a  clubhouse was added to the club. The course was sold and renamed Pine Ridge Golf Club in November 2018.

Golf course
The front nine holes winds through the Marcola hills, while the back nine is carved by the banks of the Mohawk River.

Cross country
The Bill Dellinger Invitational intercollegiate cross country meet is held annually on the golf course.

References

External links
 pineridgegolfclub.net

Tourist attractions in Lane County, Oregon
College cross country courses in the United States
Cross country running courses in Oregon
Golf clubs and courses in Oregon
Oregon Ducks cross country courses
1957 establishments in Oregon